Lorenzo Maria Dickmann (born 24 September 1996) is an Italian footballer who plays for Serie B club SPAL. He is right-footed and plays as a right-back.

Club career
On 2 September 2019, he joined Chievo on a season-long loan.

Honours

Club
 Novara
Lega Pro: 2014–15
Supercoppa di Lega Pro: 2015

References

External links

1996 births
Footballers from Milan
Living people
Italian footballers
Italian people of German descent
Italy youth international footballers
Italy under-21 international footballers
Association football defenders
Novara F.C. players
S.P.A.L. players
A.C. ChievoVerona players
Serie A players
Serie B players
Serie C players